GCHS may refer to:

 Japan
 Gunma Prefectural College of Health Sciences, Maebashi, Gunma

 South Korea
 Geochang High School, Geochang-gun, Gyeongsangnam-do Province

 United States
 Gadsden City High School, Gadsden, Alabama
 Gallup Catholic High School, Gallup, New Mexico
 Garden City High School (Kansas), Garden City, Kansas
 Garden City High School (Michigan), Garden City, Michigan
 Garden City High School (New York), Garden City, New York
 Gate City High School, Gate City, Virginia
 Gates County Senior High School, Gatesville, North Carolina
 Gehlen Catholic High School, LeMars, Iowa
 Geibel Catholic High School, Connellsville, Pennsylvania
 George County High School, Lucedale, Mississippi
 Gibault Catholic High School, Waterloo, Illinois
 Giles County High School, Pulaski, Tennessee
 Glen Cove High School, Glen Cove, New York
 Grand Canyon High School, Grand Canyon Village, Arizona
 Grant Community High School, Fox Lake, Illinois
 Granville Central High School, Stem, North Carolina
 Grape Creek High School, San Angelo, Texas
 Gray's Creek High School, Hope Mills, North Carolina
 Grayson County High School (Kentucky), Leitchfield, Kentucky
 Green County High School, Greensburg, Kentucky
 Greene Central High School, Greene County, North Carolina
 Greenfield-Central High School, Greenfield, Indiana
 Greenup County High School, Greenup, Kentucky
 Grove City High School, Grove City, Ohio
 Grover Cleveland High School (Buffalo, New York)
 Grover Cleveland High School (Queens), New York City
 Grundy County High School, Coalmont, Tennessee
 Greeley Central High School, Greeley, Colorado
 St. Theodore Guerin High School, Noblesville, Indiana
 Gulf Coast High School, Naples, Florida